Songs from Home is the title of a recording by the American folk music and country blues artists Doc Watson and Merle Watson, released in 2002. It contains tracks from Watson's years on the Poppy and United Artists labels plus four previously unreleased tracks.

At the Grammy Awards of 1980 "Big Sandy/Leather Britches" won the Grammy Award for Best Country Instrumental Performance.

Track listing
 "My Creole Belle" (Mississippi John Hurt, Watson) – 2:42
 "T for Texas (Blue Yodel No. 1)" (Jimmie Rodgers) – 3:48
 "Big Sandy/Leather Britches" (Traditional) – 1:51
 "Shady Grove" (Traditional) – 2:40
 "Match Box Blues" (Blind Lemon Jefferson) – 3:32
 "Rambling Hobo" (Doc Watson) – 1:51
 "Southbound Passenger Train" (Traditional) – 2:24
 "Little Beggar Man/Old Joe Clark" (Traditional) – 2:10
 "Wild Bill Jones" (Traditional) – 2:53
 "Bonaparte's Retreat" (Pee Wee King, Redd Stewart) – 2:03
 "Wake Up, Little Maggie" (Gaither Carlton, Doc Watson) – 2:53
 "Double File and Salt Creek" (Traditional) – 1:41
 "Daybreak Blues" (Jimmie Rodgers) – 4:00
 "Peartree" (Gaither Carlton, Doc Watson) – 2:21
 "My Rose of Old Kentucky" (Bill Monroe) – 2:39
 "St. James Hospital/Frosty Morn" (Traditional) – 6:29
 "Freight Train Boogie" (Watson) – 3:00

Personnel
Doc Watson – guitar, harmonica, vocals
Merle Watson – guitar, banjo

References

2002 compilation albums
Doc Watson compilation albums